Rainer Poser (born 14 May 1941) is a German bantamweight boxer who won the bronze medals of international competitions. He competed for the SC Dynamo Berlin / Sportvereinigung (SV) Dynamo. He also competed in the men's bantamweight event at the 1964 Summer Olympics.

References 

1941 births
Living people
Bantamweight boxers
German male boxers
Olympic boxers of the United Team of Germany
Boxers at the 1964 Summer Olympics